PR domain zinc finger protein 1, or B lymphocyte-induced maturation protein-1 (BLIMP-1), is a protein in humans encoded by the gene PRDM1 located on chromosome 6q21. BLIMP-1 is considered a 'master regulator' of hematopoietic stem cells, and plays a critical role in the development of plasma B cells, T cells, dendritic cells (DCs), macrophages, and osteoclasts. Pattern Recognition Receptors (PRRs) can activate BLIMP-1, both as a direct target and through downstream activation. BLIMP-1 is a transcription factor that triggers expression of many downstream signaling cascades. As a fine-tuned and contextual rheostat of the immune system, BLIMP-1 up- or down-regulates immune responses depending on the precise scenarios. BLIMP-1 is highly expressed in exhausted T-cells – clones of dysfunctional T-cells with diminished functions due to chronic immune response against cancer, viral infections, or organ transplant.

Function 

As a potent repressor of beta-interferon (IFN-β), BLIMP-1 competes for interferon regulatory factors (IRF) binding sites in the IFN-β promoter due to its sequence similarity with IRF1 and IRF2. However, BLIMP-1 cools down and activates immune responses in a highly contextual manner. BLIMP-1 represses NFκB/TNF-R pathway repressor NLRP12, thus indirectly activating the immune response. BLIMP-1 expression is also upregulated by danger signals from double-stranded RNA (specific to virus), lipopolysaccharides (specific to gram-negative bacteria), unmethylated CpG DNA (abundant in bacterial genomes), and cancer inflammation via Toll-like receptor (TLR) 3, TLR-4, TLR-9, and STAT signaling, respectively.

The increased expression of the BLIMP-1 protein in B lymphocytes, T lymphocytes, NK cells and other immune system cells leads to an immune response through proliferation and differentiation of antibody secreting plasma cells. In a monocytic cell line, over-expression of BLIMP-1 can lead to differentiation into mature macrophages. BLIMP-1 also plays a role in osteoclastogenesis as well as in the modulation of dendritic cells. Other cells of the immune system such as human peripheral blood monocytes and granulocytes also express BLIMP-1.

As a transcriptional repressor, BLIMP-1 has a critical role in the foundation of the mouse germ cell lineage, as its disruption causes a block early in the process of primordial germ cell formation. BLIMP-1-deficient mutant embryos form a tight cluster of about 20 primordial germ cell-like cells, which fail to show the characteristic migration, proliferation and consistent repression of homeobox genes that normally accompany specification of primordial germ cells. BLIMP-1 is widely expressed in stem cells of developing embryos. The genetic lineage-tracing experiments indicate that the BLIMP-1-positive cells originating from the proximal posterior epiblast cells are indeed the lineage-restricted primordial germ cell precursors.

B cell development 

BLIMP-1 is an important regulator of plasma cell differentiation. During B cell development, a B cell can either differentiate into a short-lived plasma cell or into a germinal center B cell after receiving proper activation and co-stimulation. BLIMP-1 acts as a master gene regulating the transcriptional network that regulates B cell terminal differentiation. Except for naïve and memory B cells, all antibody secreting cells express BLIMP-1 regardless of their location and differentiation history.  BLIMP-1 directly initiates unfolded protein response (UPR) by activating Ire1, Xbp1, and Atf6, allowing the plasma B cells to produce vast amounts of antibody. BLIMP-1 expression is carefully controlled: the expression of BLIMP-1 is low or undetectable in primary B cells, and only upregulated in plasmablasts and plasma cells. BLIMP-1 is a direct transcriptional target of IRF-4, which is also necessary for B-cell differentiation. The premature expression of BLIMP-1 in primary B cells results in cell death, so only cells that are ready to initiate transcription driven by BLIMP-1 are able to survive and differentiate. However, without BLIMP-1, proliferating B cells are unable to differentiate to plasma cells, resulting in severe reduction in production of all isotypes of immunoglobulin.

T cell development 

BLIMP-1 promotes naive T-cells to differentiate into T-helper (Th) 2 lineage, while repressing the differentiation into Th1, Th17, and follicular Th. BLIMP-1 is also required for differentiation of cytotoxic T-cell. Specifically, the expression of granzyme B (a source of cytotoxicity) in Tc depends on the presence of BLIMP-1 and interleukin-2 (IL-2) cytokine.

BLIMP-1 is a gatekeeper of T-cell activation and plays a key role in maintaining normal T cell homeostasis. BLIMP-1 deficiency leads to high numbers of activated T helper cells and severe autoimmune diseases in laboratory mice. BLIMP-1 is important in dampening autoimmunity, as well as antiviral and antitumor responses. BLIMP-1 regulates T cell activation through a negative feedback loop: T cell activation leads to IL-2 production, IL-2 leads to PRDM1 transcription,  and BLIMP-1 feeds back to repress IL-2 gene transcription.

T cell exhaustion 

Multiple studies have reported high expression of BLIMP-1 in exhausted T cells. T cell exhaustion is usually a result of chronic immune activations, commonly caused by viral infection (e.g. HIV), cancer, or organ transplant. High expression of BLIMP-1 in Tc and Th cells is associated with the transcription of receptors inhibiting immune responses, though it is unclear whether the relation between BLIMP-1 expression and T-cell exhaustion is causal or just associative. 

BLIMP-1 helps the production of short-lived effector T cells and clonally exhausted T cells. It also helps with the migration of T cells out of the spleen and lymph nodes into peripheral tissues. However, BLIMP-1 does not promote the production of long-lived effector memory cells. BLIMP-1 allows the production of some longer lived effector memory cells but its absence allows for the generation of long term central memory cells, which are thought to have a higher potential of proliferation on secondary challenge.

DCs and macrophages development 

BLIMP-1 has been shown in vitro as a cell lineage determinant in monocytes, inducing their differentiation into DCs and macrophages. It is speculated to have the similar effects in vivo. In addition, BLIMP-1 also suppressed myeloid cells from differentiating into granulocytes, which includes eosinophil, basophil, and neutrophils. The role of BLIMP-1 in DCs and macrophages development is a matter of interest because analysis have suggested that DCs, rather than B-cells, is the way in which individual with single nucleotide polymorphisms (SNP) near BLIMP-1  (specifically, rs548234 in Han Chinese, and rs6568431 in European) are predisposed to Systemic Lupus Erythematosus (SLE).

Osteoclast development 

Osteoclasts are multinucleated cells that break down and resorb bone tissues. Together with osteoblasts, which form new bones, osteoclast helps maintain and repair bone in vertebrates. BLIMP-1 directly and indirectly represses anti-osteoclastogenesis  genes such as Bcl6, IRF8, and MafB, helping monocytes differentiate into osteoclasts. In mice, insufficient expression of BLIMP-1 in osteoclast progenitors would lead to abnormal development of the skeleton.

Diseases related to BLIMP-1 

SNPs near the PRDM1 gene have been identified in genome-wide association studies (GWAS) to be linked to lupus (SLE) and rheumatoid arthritis (RA). BLIMP-1 represses the expression of the proinflammatory cytokine Interleukin-6 (IL-6), and cathepsin S (CTSS), which promotes antigen processing and presentation. BLIMP-1 deficiency and IL-6 overexpression were linked to inflammatory bowel disease (IBD) and SLE.

Another GWAS has identified two genetic variations near the PRDM1 gene that predict an increased likelihood of developing a second cancer after radiation treatment for Hodgkin lymphoma.

References

Further reading

External links 
 
 

Transcription factors